The 2013 Caoxijiu Suzhou Ladies Open was a professional tennis tournament played on hard courts. It was the second edition of the tournament which was part of the 2013 WTA 125K series. It took place in Suzhou, China, on 5–11 August 2013.

Singles draw entrants

Seeds 

 1 Rankings as of 29 July 2013

Other entrants 
The following players received wildcards into the singles main draw:
  Zhu Lin
  Yang Zi
  Liu Chang
  Wang Yafan

The following players received entry from the qualifying draw:
  Liu Fangzhou
  Han Xinyun
  Peangtarn Plipuech
  Hu Yueyue

The following player received entry into the singles main draw as a lucky loser:
  Lee So-ra

Doubles draw entrants

Seeds

Other entrants 
The following pair received a wildcard into the doubles draw:
  Tian Ran /  Zhu Lin

Champions

Singles 

  Shahar Pe'er def.  Zheng Saisai 6–2, 2–6, 6–3

Doubles 

  Tímea Babos /  Michaëlla Krajicek def.  Han Xinyun /  Eri Hozumi 6–2, 6–2

External links 
 2013 Suzhou Ladies Open at wtatennis.com
 

2013 WTA 125K series
2013
2013 in Chinese tennis